Barranyi (North Island) National Park is in the Gulf of Carpentaria in the Northern Territory of Australia, 737 km southeast of Darwin.

See also
 Protected areas of the Northern Territory

References

External links
 Official fact sheet and map

National parks of the Northern Territory
Protected areas established in 1991
1991 establishments in Australia